Ammar (also spelled Amar; , ʿAmmār) is an Arabic masculine given name.

Notable people with this name include:

Given name 
Ammar al-Basri, 9th century East Syriac Christian theologian.
Ammar al-Bakri, British-Iraqi lawyer
Ammar Campa-Najjar (born 1989), California Congressional candidate
Amar Ezzahi (1941–2016), Algerian singer
Ammar Habib, Syrian footballer
Ammar al-Hakim, Iraqi politician
Ammar Hassan, Palestinian musician
Amar Jaleel, Pakistani writer 
Amar Gegić, Bosnian basketball player
Ammar Jemal, Tunisian footballer
Amar Lal, Pakistani politician
Amar Osim, Bosnian football coach
Ammar Nakshawani, Islamic lecturer
Amar Ramasar, American ballet dancer
Ammar Rihawi, Syrian football coach
Ammar al-Saffar, Iraqi politician
Ammar Siamwalla, Thai economist

Surname 
 Ali Ammar, Algerian guerilla leader
 Ali Ammar, Lebanese politician
 Ali Ammar, Canadian actor
 Michael Ammar, American magician
 Sonia Ben Ammar (born 1999), Tunisian-French model and singer
 Tarak Ben Ammar, Tunisian-French film producer

See also
Amar (disambiguation)

Amar, Lorestan, or Ammar, a village in Iran

Arabic-language surnames
Arabic masculine given names
Bosniak masculine given names
Indian masculine given names